Tulsidas Borkar (18 November 1934 – 29 September 2018) was an Indian composer and harmonium player. The Government of India awarded him the civilian honour of the Padma Shri in 2016.

Awards

Borkar received a number of awards, including the Sangeet Natak Akademi Award, New Delhi (2005) and Padma Shri (2016). Other awards included:

 State Reward for Excellence from the Directorate of Art & Culture, Govt. of Goa (18 August 2007).
Smt.Indirabai Khadilkar Puraskar (2006) by Bharat Gayan Samaj, Pune.
Pt. Bandubhaiya Chaughule Smruti Puraskar, Indore (2004).
Pt.Vitthalrao Korgaonkar Smruti Puraskar by Surel Samvadini  Samvardhan- Belgaum (2002).
ITC Sangeet Research Academy Award (2001).
Master Dinanath Mangeshkar Smruti Gungaurav Puraskar (2000) from Yojana Pratishthan & Nirgudkar Foundation.
Samrat Sanman from Samrat Club International, Goa.
Balgandharva Gaurav Puraskar from Akhil Bhartiya Marathi Natya Parishad sponsored  by Shrimant Madhavrao Maharaj Shinde (1999).
Govindrao Tembe Sangatkar Puraskar (19 January 1998) from Akhil Bhartiya                                    Gandharva Mahavidyalaya.
Sangeetkar Padmashree Vasant Desai Puraskar from Marathi Natya Parishad, Natvarya Keshavrao Date Puraskar (1995).
 “Pandit Ram Marathe Puraskar”.

Death

Pandit Tulsidas Borkar had been diagnosed with tuberculosis and was treated in Mumbai's Nanavati Hospital. But, due to old age, his body didn't respond well to the treatment. He died at the age of 83 on 29 September 2018 at 10:20 A.M. in Mumbai.

References

Indian male composers
Harmonium players
1934 births
2018 deaths
Hindustani instrumentalists
Recipients of the Padma Shri in arts
Recipients of the Sangeet Natak Akademi Award
Musicians from Goa
People from North Goa district
20th-century Indian male classical singers
Recipients of the Sangeet Natak Akademi Fellowship